Andrew Osborne (born 4 March 1981 in Fiji) was a Fijian-born United States rugby union player. His playing position was fullback. He was selected as a reserve for the United States at the 2007 Rugby World Cup, but did not make an appearance. He though made 2 appearances for the United States in 2007.

Reference list

External links
itsrugby.co.uk profile

1981 births
United States international rugby union players
Living people
Rugby union fullbacks